Joannou & Paraskevaides was a Cypriot international building, civil and electromechanical engineering contractor with an involvement in the energy (oil and gas) and industrial sectors operating in the Middle East, North Africa, Europe and Asia.  At its zenith, the construction giant that was J&P Overseas Ltd., had about 15,000 people on staff and boasted a turnover in excess of $1.5billion.

History

North Africa and the Middle East
Joannou & Paraskevaides (Overseas) Limited (“J&P(O) Ltd”) was established in 1961 in Guernsey, Channel Islands. J&P(O) Ltd completed its first overseas projects in Libya in the 1960s. J&P(O) Ltd then took its next major step and expanded into the Persian Gulf in the 1970s.
During the subsequent decades, J&P(O) Ltd played a leading role in the Persian Gulf's construction boom completing highways in all types of terrain, tunnels, bridges and flyovers, airports, housing schemes, palaces, luxury hotels, hospitals, universities, commercial buildings, sports and conference centers and complex military projects.

Electrical and Mechanical Expertise Acquired 
On 1 January 2006, J&P(O) Ltd wholly acquired two specialist electrical and mechanical contractors A&P Paraskevaides (Overseas) Ltd and Conspel Construction Specialists (Isle of Man) Ltd. region. Their acquisition allows J&P(O) Ltd to supplement its current activities and expand its construction capability and expertise.

Closure
Before going into liquidation, the company disposed of its stake in Queen Alia Airport in Amman, which was expected to generate more than USD 100 mln in revenue.

J&P Overseas was shut down with the company accumulating damages of around USD 750 mln.

The problems at J&P Overseas emerged in 2017, sending the company into liquidation, after banks rejected its restructuring proposal.

Notable completed projects
J&P(O)Ltd's most notable completed projects include:

 the Seeb International Airport in Muscat, Oman which was completed in 1976. It is the main airport in Oman and the hub for the national carrier Oman Air.
 the King Fahd International Airport in Dammam, Saudi Arabia which was completed in 1993. It is the largest airport in the world in terms of land area, thus making it larger than the nearby country of Bahrain.
 the Abu Dhabi International Airport in Abu Dhabi, United Arab Emirates. finished in 1981. It is the second largest airport in the U.A.E.
 the Rio-Antirio bridge in Greece completed in 2004. It is a cable-stayed bridge crossing the Gulf of Corinth near Patras, linking the town of Rio on the Peloponnese to Antirrio on mainland Greece.
 the Al Bustan Palace Hotel in Muscat, Oman.
the Queen Alia International Airport in Amman, Jordan to be completed in 2011. The EPC (contract) for the Rehabilitation, Expansion and Operation of Queen Alia International Airport is shared between J&P(O) Ltd and J&P-AVAX SA. Works will increase the initial capacity of the airport to 9 million passengers annually and give the ability to expand to 12 million passengers annually. Also, the expansion of the airport will allow it to handle the Airbus A380.
Two contracts for The Pearl-Qatar artificial island, in Doha, Qatar: The Roads and Infrastructure Project for the Island to be completed during 2010, and the Design and Construction of Qanat Quartier Precinct and the Construction of 31 Villas in La Plage and Bahriya Precincts to be completed during 2011.
Additionally two further contracts were executed, one for the design, construction, supply, installation and commissioning of civil and landscaping works (both airside and landside) and the second for all works associated with the construction and commissioning of an additional hangar 'Hangar H'. Client: Emirates Airlines Consultant: ADPI Contract Value: USD 457 million Status: Completed 2010
Construction of a passenger terminal complex with a 6.5 million passenger per year and comprising terminal building (covered area ), taxiways and interconnections, aprons, car park and road works, including all electromechanical installations and external works and services.  Client: Civil Aviation Authority Consultant: NESPAK Contract Value: USD 200 million Joint Venture: J&P (O) Ltd 65% - Airsys ATM 35% Status: Completed 2002  Demolition of existing interchange (2 bridges) and reconstruction of the new interchange (7 bridges) at Al Safa area on Sheikh Zayed road. The interchanges consists of two loops, two directional links in addition to four right turn ramps, re-configuration of internal roads and parking areas within the interchange limits. Also construction of road signage, landscaping, street lighting and all associated services.  Client: Dubai Municipality Consultant: De Leuw Cather Contract Value: USD 15 million Status: Completed 2002

2001-2006 Rehabilitation road Woldiya -Addis Abeba (400 km) Ethiopia

Global International Contractor Rank
In 2009 the journal Engineering News-Record ranked J&P(O) Ltd as the 36th Largest International Contractor globally.

References

Construction and civil engineering companies of Cyprus
Oilfield services companies
Companies of Guernsey
Construction and civil engineering companies established in 1941
Non-renewable resource companies established in 1941
British companies established in 1941
1941 establishments in Cyprus
1941 establishments in the United Kingdom
Companies that filed for Chapter 11 bankruptcy in 2018